Industrial deconcentration is the movement of industrial zones (factories) away from the center of the city, and further away from each other. It is similar to suburbanization, a residential trend in which a large number of the population move away from the metropolis as the inner city becomes overcrowded.

Industrial deconcentration occurs when a previously established industrial district becomes unable to provide efficiently for its own populace due to overcrowding.  In a market economy the massive competition and overcrowding of the metropolitan area forces people and businesses to move out to less-industrial areas with less traffic congestion.  Modernization in the social, economic, and technological fields of a country is a factor in accelerating industrial deconcentration.

This phenomenon is more apparent in nations that have been industrialized for a longer time.  Most countries experiencing industrial deconcentration at the beginning of the 21st century are the states that began industrializing after the end of World War II.

Industrial deconcentration is a conscious goal in a comprehensive decentralization policy:  to deconcentrate population without excessive commuting, jobs need to be created outside the cities.

See also
Rust Belt

Decentralization
Economic geography
Urban planning